Ehrenfeld is "field of honor" in German.
Ehrenfeld may refer to:
 Ehrenfeld, Pennsylvania
 Ehrenfeld, Cologne, borough of the city of Cologne, Germany
 Ehrenfeld Group, an anti-Nazi resistance group centered in Cologne
 Ehrenfeld (surname)